José Manuel Crespo (born April 4, 1972) is a Spanish sprint canoer who competed from the mid-1990s to the early 2000s (decade). At the 1996 Summer Olympics in Atlanta, he was eliminated in the semifinals both of the C-1 500 m and the C-1 1000 m events. Four years later in Sydney, Crespo was eliminated in the semifinals of the same event.

References
Sports-Reference.com profile

1972 births
Canoeists at the 1996 Summer Olympics
Canoeists at the 2000 Summer Olympics
Living people
Olympic canoeists of Spain
Spanish male canoeists